Leonardo Iván Véliz Díaz (born September 3, 1945) is a Chilean former footballer who played as a left winger for Everton, O'Higgins, Unión Española and Colo-Colo of Chile and in the Chile national team in the 1974 FIFA World Cup in Germany.

Managerial career
He worked as manager of both Chile U17 and Chile U20, leading the first in the 1993 FIFA World Championship and the second in the 1995 FIFA World Youth Championship.

From 1998 to 2000 he worked for the Sporting CP youth system, where he coincided with players such as Cristiano Ronaldo, Ricardo Quaresma and Fábio Paím.

Personal life
He is well known by his nickname Pollo (Chicken).

His son, Daniel Sebastián Véliz, represented Chile at under-20 level in the 1992 South American Championship.

In 2004, he was elected a councillor of Santiago, supported by Party for Democracy. In 2010, he switched to the other political hand after supporting Sebastián Piñera in his candidacy for President of Chile.

Honours
Unión Española
 Chilean Primera División: 1975, 1977

Colo-Colo
 Chilean Primera División: 1972, 1979, 1981

Chile
 Copa O'Higgins: 1966
 :

References

External links
 Profile at FIFA.com Profile at

Living people
1945 births
Sportspeople from Valparaíso
Chilean footballers
Chile international footballers
Everton de Viña del Mar footballers
Unión Española footballers
Colo-Colo footballers
O'Higgins F.C. footballers
Chilean Primera División players
1974 FIFA World Cup players
1975 Copa América players
1979 Copa América players
Association football wingers
Chilean football managers
Chile national under-20 football team managers
Chilean expatriate sportspeople in Portugal
Expatriate football managers in Portugal
Chilean politicians
Chilean sportsperson-politicians
21st-century Chilean politicians